The Kiglapait Mountains lie north of Nain, in northern Labrador, south of the Torngat and Kaumajet Mountains. Not as high as those ranges, they still boast very rugged terrain and many peaks with high prominence values.  The name means "dog-tooth."

External links
 
Photo gallery, Aerial photos of Kiglapait Mountains  by Doc Searls

Labrador
Mountain ranges of Newfoundland and Labrador